Jonathan Javier Goya (born 14 March 1989) is an Argentine professional footballer who plays as a midfielder for Deportivo Riestra.

Career
Goya's career in senior football got underway in 2008 with Deportivo Riestra. He scored ten goals in one hundred and forty-three appearances for the club between 2008 and 2014, with the club winning the 2013–14 Primera D Metropolitana title to gain a place in Primera C Metropolitana; where he appeared eighteen times. His first appearance in Primera B Metropolitana arrived on 23 February 2015, as he appeared for fifty minutes of a win over Villa San Carlos; he was substituted off for Daniel Caputo. Thirty-three appearances occurred that season, though three ended prematurely after the defender received a red card in each match.

Goya's first goal at that level came against Talleres in the 2016–17 Primera B Metropolitana, in a campaign which ended with promotion to Primera B Nacional for 2017–18. One goal in eleven fixtures arrived in the second tier, as the club were relegated following a points deduction. After one further season with the club, Goya left in July 2019 to Almirante Brown. However, a year later, in June 2020, he returned to Deportivo Riestra.

Career statistics
.

Honours
Deportivo Riestra
Primera D Metropolitana: 2013–14

References

External links

1989 births
Living people
Footballers from Buenos Aires
Argentine footballers
Association football defenders
Primera D Metropolitana players
Primera C Metropolitana players
Primera B Metropolitana players
Primera Nacional players
Deportivo Riestra players
Club Almirante Brown footballers